{{Infobox comedian
| name         = David Cross
| image        = David Cross (32840211217) (cropped).jpg
| caption      = Cross in 2019
| birth_date   =  
| birth_place  =  Roswell, Georgia, U.S.
| death_date   =
| death_place  =
| years_active = 1981–present
| notable_work = {{plainlist|
 Mr. Show
 Arrested Development
 The Increasingly Poor Decisions of Todd Margaret
 Freak Show
 Alvin and the Chipmunks
 Kung Fu Panda}}
| spouse       = 
| children     = 1
| genre        = 
}}
David Cross (born April 4, 1964) is an American stand-up comedian, actor, director, and writer known for his stand-up performances, the HBO sketch comedy series Mr. Show (1995–1998), and his role as Tobias Fünke in the Fox/Netflix sitcom Arrested Development (2003–2006, 2013–2019).

Cross created, wrote, executively produced, and starred in The Increasingly Poor Decisions of Todd Margaret (2010–2016); developed and had a prominent role in Freak Show (2006); appeared on Modern Family (2011–2012); and portrayed Ian Hawke in the first three live-action/CGI Alvin and the Chipmunks films (2007–2011). Cross has also done voice work for the sitcom Oliver Beene (2003–2004), and has had lead voice-over roles in Curious George (2006), Battle for Terra (2007), the Kung Fu Panda film franchise (2008–present), Megamind (2010) and Next Gen (2018).

In 1993, he won a Primetime Emmy Award for Outstanding Writing for a Variety Series for his work on The Ben Stiller Show. For Mr. Show, he gained three Primetime Emmy Award nominations, and for Arrested Development, Cross was nominated for a Satellite Award for Best Supporting Actor – Television Series, and, along with his cast, for three Screen Actors Guild Award for Outstanding Performance by an Ensemble in a Comedy Series. For his stand-up specials, he was nominated for several Grammy Awards.

Early life
Cross was born in Roswell, Georgia, to a Jewish family. His parents are Barry and Susi, the former of whom emigrated from Leeds, England. Six months after his birth, Cross's family moved to Florida. After additional moves to New York and Connecticut, the family settled back in Roswell, where Cross remained for nearly a decade. He is the oldest of three children and has two younger sisters, Juli Cross and Wendy Cross.

The family had little money.  Cross recalled they were evicted from their home and that he spent some time living in motels and at friends' homes in his youth.  Barry left the family when David was 10 years old; the two have not spoken since he was 19, though they both primarily resided in New York City until Cross sold his home there in 2011.

Career
Stand-up
At age 17, Cross began performing stand-up comedy. The day after he graduated from Northside High School in Atlanta, Cross relocated to New York City. Lacking a plan, he drifted, working briefly for a lawn care company on Long Island. Later, he enrolled at Emerson College in Boston. He would drop out after a semester, but during his time there, Cross joined This is Pathetic, a college sketch group, where he met John Ennis. Aspiring towards an acting career, the two took a road trip to Los Angeles in the summer of 1985, although this did not significantly further their acting careers. In Boston, Cross began to perform stand-up more regularly. From the mid-1980s to the early 1990s, Boston had a booming comedy scene, although Cross did not fit the types of acts being booked most of the time. He recalls that it was "a loud, dumb, pandering, racist, homophobic-type scene".

In 1990, a new comedy scene began to emerge at the comedy club chain Catch a Rising Star. Alongside Janeane Garofalo, Louis C.K., and other comics, Cross appeared regularly several nights a week. Cross formed the sketch comedy group "Cross Comedy" with 12 other performers, and they put on a new show every week. They were known for playing tricks on the audience, such as introducing fake comics or planting fake hecklers. Cross became increasingly focused on his comedy work.

Cross later performed at the alternative comedy club Un-Cabaret in Los Angeles, where radio artist Joe Frank heard him, and hired him to appear in Frank's 1994 radio programs, "A Hearing" and "The Last Run" (in 1997 combined to become "The OJ Chronicles"), where Cross appears as OJ's valet. Cross also starred in the Joe Frank program "Jam", produced in 1999, and worked with Frank on radio shows for KCRW's Unfictional: "A Conversation" (2013) and "Downfall" (2015).

Cross's stand-up comedy blends political commentary and satire. In 1999, he performed a one-hour comedy special, The Pride Is Back, on HBO.  In 2003, he released his first tour film, Let America Laugh, and was named #85 on Comedy Central's list of the 100 greatest stand-ups of all time. He has released five comedy albums: 2002's Shut Up You Fucking Baby!, 2004's It's Not Funny, 2010's Bigger and Blackerer, 2016's Making America Great Again/...America... Great..., and 2019's Oh, Come On. He was nominated for the Grammy Award for Best Comedy Album twice, in 2003 for Shut Up You Fucking Baby! and in 2016 for ...America... Great....

Cross's first three records were released on CD by indie-rock label Sub Pop, and on vinyl by comedy label Stand Up! Records for Shut Up and It's Not Funny. He self-released 2016's ...America... Great... on CD, with Stand Up! again releasing a vinyl version.  Oh, Come On was released by Comedy Dynamics. Cross tends to release his albums in overlapping audio and video formats which each contain material not found on the other. This is the case on  Bigger and Blackerer, Oh, Come On, and perhaps most obviously the 2016 companion set Making America Great Again (a Netflix film) and ...America... Great... (CD/vinyl audio), which have different titles. Oh, Come Ons video and audio versions were recorded at two different shows on the same tour.

Cross's stand-up material was featured in Comedy Central's 2004 animated series Shorties Watchin' Shorties. He appears on several Un-Cabaret compilation albums, including Freak Weather Feels Different and The Good, the Bad and the Drugly.

Television, film and voice roles

Cross began his professional television career as a writer on The Ben Stiller Show. The series hired him toward the end of its run, and he occasionally made brief appearances in the sketches. He had a speaking role in "The Legend of T.J. O'Pootertoot", a sketch written almost entirely by Cross. It was during this period that he first met Bob Odenkirk, with whom he would later co-create the HBO sketch comedy series Mr. Show in 1995. Cross won an Emmy for his work on The Ben Stiller Show in 1993. In 1997 he played Newton, an employee of the NYC Morgue in Men in Black, and reprised the character, now as an owner of a video rental store, in Men in Black II in 2002.

Cross later co-starred as Tobias Fünke in Arrested Development, originally intended to be only a minor role. He also played smaller roles on programs such as Just Shoot Me!, The Drew Carey Show, NewsRadio, Strangers with Candy, Tim and Eric Awesome Show, Great Job, and Aqua Teen Hunger Force. From October 2005, Cross regularly appeared on Comedy Central's The Colbert Report as Stephen Colbert's nemesis Russ Lieber, a fictional liberal radio talk show host from Madison, Wisconsin. Cross developed an animated series for Comedy Central called Freak Show, which co-starred H. Jon Benjamin and was cancelled due to low ratings. He has appeared several times on Wonder Showzen.

Cross teamed up with Mr. Show director and producer Troy Miller and Odenkirk to produce a feature film Run Ronnie Run, based on one of their Mr. Show characters. The film satirized the reality television craze, and featured cameos from many stars; however, Odenkirk got into conflict with the studio New Line Cinema, and they released it direct-to-video. In 1994 and again in 1999, Cross was a guest voice actor on Joe Frank's radio show, featured in the episodes "The Last Run", "A Hearing", "The O.J. Chronicles", and "Jam". In 2013, he returned, making an appearance in an episode of Frank's radio show, entitled "A Conversation".

In 2004, Cross provided voices for a Marine in Halo 2 and a store clerk named Zero in Grand Theft Auto: San Andreas. He was also the voice of the "Happy-Time Harry" doll and Bert Banana in Aqua Teen Hunger Force (although the part was credited as Sir Willups Brightslymoore). Cross has made guest appearances in Tim and Eric Awesome Show, Great Job! He directed the music video for The Black Keys' song "10 A.M. Automatic", a spoof of public-access television. Paste Magazine ranked it number 24 on their list of the 50 Best Music Videos of the Decade (2000–2009).

Cross appeared in The Strokes' music video for "Juicebox" as a bad local "morning zoo" radio DJ. He also appeared in The New Pornographers' video for "Use It", in Superchunk's video for "Watery Hands" (along with Janeane Garofalo), and in Yo La Tengo's video for "Sugarcube" (along with Bob Odenkirk and John Ennis). Cross contributes to Vice magazine, writing a column, My America. In 2005, he contributed to the UNICEF benefit song "Do They Know It's Hallowe'en?" and appeared in one of PETA's "I'd Rather Go Naked Than Wear Fur" campaigns.

In the Beastie Boys' 2006 concert film Awesome; I Fuckin' Shot That!, Cross portrays Nathaniel Hörnblowér in the fictional segment "A Day in the Life of Nathaniel Hörnblowér". In I'm Not There, Cross portrays Allen Ginsberg. Both Bill Lawrence and Zach Braff of the TV series Scrubs were eager to have Cross make a cameo appearance on the series as Tobias Fünke, but due to the series' cancellation, the plan never came to fruition.

Cross provided commentary on the Vicarious music video DVD for Tool. He has previously performed comedy as an opening act for the band and its members appeared on Mr. Show several times. He portrayed Ian Hawke in Alvin and the Chipmunks, Alvin and the Chipmunks: The Squeakquel, and Alvin and the Chipmunks: Chipwrecked and voiced Crane in the Kung Fu Panda film franchise.

Cross starred in David's Situation, a pilot for HBO. It filmed in May 2008 and included many Mr. Show alumni at the taping. On August 6, 2008, Bob Odenkirk announced on bobanddavid.com that David's Situation would not be produced.

Cross's black comedy series The Increasingly Poor Decisions of Todd Margaret, in which he stars and co-writes with Shaun Pye, has run on Channel 4 in the United Kingdom and IFC in the United States since October 2010, for a total 18 episodes. On March 29, 2010, his first comedy special in six years, Bigger and Blackerer, was streamed on Epix HD. A CD with "slightly different content" was released on May 25, 2010.

In 2009, Cross released his first book I Drink for a Reason. The book features memoirs, satirical fictional memoirs, and material from Cross that originally appeared in other publications. In September 2009, Cross performed at his own comedy stage at the ATP New York 2009 music festival, for which he picked Eugene Mirman, H. Jon Benjamin, Jon Glaser, and Derrick Brown & The Navy Gravy to join him. In the same year, Cross and Benjamin created and wrote for Paid Programming on Adult Swim. Paid Programming was not picked up for a full series and Benjamin referred to it as an "abject failure".

Cross starred alongside Julia Stiles and America Ferrera in It's a Disaster, which premiered at the 2012 Los Angeles Film Festival. Oscilloscope Laboratories acquired US distribution rights to the film, releasing it in select theaters beginning April 13, 2013.

Cross's directorial debut film Hits premiered at the 2014 Sundance Film Festival. Instead of selling the film rights to distributors, Cross instead opted to sell the movie over Bit Torrent through their "bundles" program, which BitTorrent launched to help "legitimize" the platform. According to The Verge, it was the first feature film to be distributed in such a format. At the same time, Cross launched a Kickstarter campaign for the movie's general release which would then distribute the movie using a pay what you want methodology.

In April 2015, episodes were ordered for a new sketch comedy show starring Cross and Odenkirk called W/ Bob & David. It premiered in November 2015 on Netflix. Cross and Odenkirk write, star in, and produce the show.

On the January 10, 2016, broadcast of the National Public Radio-syndicated quiz show Ask Me Another, Cross appeared as a celebrity guest and performed well enough that at the audience's request the show's producers took the unusual step of allowing him to advance to the show's final, championship round; he then won that round and became that episode's overall champion, winning a prize package that included a pair of denim cutoff shorts that he himself had autographed.

He created the eight-episode black comedy series Bliss, which was released by the BritBox streaming service in 2018. It stars Stephen Mangan as Andrew, a fraudulent travel writer, who is struggling to maintain long-term relationships with two partners, Kim (Heather Graham) and Denise (Jo Hartley), who are not aware of one another. The same year Cross provided the lead character's "white voice" in the science fiction comedy film Sorry to Bother You,

Influences
Cross has said his comedic influences include Bill Hicks, Andy Kaufman, Monty Python's Flying Circus, Lou Costello, Steven Wright, Richard Pryor, and Lenny Bruce.

Controversies
In October 2005, Cross was sued by Nashville club manager Thomas Weber, who accused Cross of supposedly taping him without permission for Shut Up You Fucking Baby and Let America Laugh in apparent violation of Weber's privacy rights. In April 2006, the case against Cross was dismissed and the case proceeded with Warner Music, Subpop Records, WEA Corporation, and the Alternative Distribution Alliance.

In a 2012 interview with Playboy magazine, Cross revealed that he had done a small amount of cocaine at the 2009 White House Correspondents' Dinner. Cross spoke on the matter, "It wasn't like I got high... It was just about being able to say that I did it, that I did cocaine in the same room as the president."

In October 2017, Cross apologized to actor-comedian Charlyne Yi for racially insensitive comments that he had made toward Yi in the mid-2000s. In a lengthy response, Cross tweeted, "I am NOT accusing Charlene of lying, and I'm truly sorry if I hurt her, it was never my intention to do that. I do not remember it like she remembers (and clearly we're quite a bit far apart on this) but I reached out to her privately and expressed that and more, including the possibility that perhaps we are both misremembering *exactly* what happened that night." Five days later he tweeted, "Charlyne I'm sorry that I hurt you and that this whole thing played out as it did."

In August 2018, members of the Church of Jesus Christ of Latter-day Saints protested against a photo which Cross tweeted of himself wearing "Mormon religious undergarments". The tweet was meant to promote his show at the University of Utah's Kingsbury Hall in Salt Lake City, Utah. The university president issued a statement condemning apparent "bigotry and religious intolerance" and calling the imagery "deeply offensive". Citing the First Amendment, the university said it would not "censor the content of those coming to campus."

Criticisms and feuds
Larry the Cable Guy
In April 2005, Cross criticized stand-up comedian Larry the Cable Guy in a Rolling Stone interview, saying, "It's a lot of anti-gay, racist humor—which people like in America—all couched in 'I'm telling it like it is.' He's in the right place at the right time for that gee-shucks, proud-to-be-a-redneck, I'm-just-a-straight-shooter-multimillionaire-in-cutoff-flannel-selling-ring-tones act. That's where we are as a nation now. We're in a state of vague American values and anti-intellectual pride."

In response, Larry devoted a chapter in his book GIT-R-DONE to Cross and the "PC left", claiming that Cross had supposedly "screwed with my fans, it was time for me to say something". Larry claimed that Rolling Stone was baiting comedians to attack him, and they turned to Cross only after Lewis Black refused; as Larry and Black are good friends. Cross responded with An Open Letter to Larry the Cable Guy posted on his website. He continued to mock Larry in his stand-up, satirizing Blue Collar TV during a guest appearance on Wonder Showzen. In December 2005, he ended his performance on Comedy Central's Last Laugh '05 by mockingly yelling Larry's catchphrase, "GIT-R-DONE!", to the audience as he left the stage. He poked fun at Larry's comedy in Freak Show with a character called "Danny the Plumber Guy".

James Lipton
Cross has criticized Inside the Actors Studio host James Lipton on a Mr. Show sketch and in his stand-up performance The Pride Is Back, calling him "pretentious". Lipton, who thought that Cross's impression of him was not good-natured, would later appear alongside Cross in Arrested Development, in the recurring role of Prison Warden Stefan Gentiles. During filming, Cross was impressed with Lipton's acting and comedic ability, and the two became good friends. On one commentary track for season four of Mr. Show, Cross discussed the encounter, complimenting Lipton for his professionalism and performance, saying that he liked Lipton personally but still "didn't care for" Inside The Actors Studio.

Alvin and the Chipmunks
Responding to critics of his decision to appear in the critically panned, but commercially successful, Alvin and the Chipmunks, Cross said the film paid for a summer cottage and more than "all my other projects combined: book, TV show, the two pilots, Year One, yeah." Although he has admitted to taking the role primarily for the money, Cross has said that he does not regret doing so or consider it to be "selling out," as he has nothing against entertainment designed for children that does not send a bad message to the public. Cross reprised his Chipmunks role in two of the film's sequels, Alvin and the Chipmunks: The Squeakquel and Alvin and the Chipmunks: Chipwrecked.Cross described Chipwrecked as "literally without question, the most unpleasant experience I've ever had in my professional life". He accused an unidentified producer of antisemitism and of mistreating him. Cross was also "forced at legal gunpoint" to spend a week shooting footage on a Carnival Cruise, which Cross argued was pointless since he had no lines and was unrecognizable in a pelican suit. That cost Cross a $150,000 bonus for violating his non-disparagement clause by discussing his grievances publicly.

 Scott Stapp 
Cross has been critical of several pop music acts in his stand-up comedy, notably Creed and its lead singer Scott Stapp. On his 2004 album It's Not Funny, Cross referred to Creed as "the third-worst band in history", and maligned the group's pop sensibilities for being too ubiquitous, suggesting that Stapp hung around "10th grade girls' locker rooms" to find inspiration for his song lyrics. Cross then relates an anecdote about Stapp being a last-minute replacement for another celebrity at a taping of Celebrity Poker Showdown in 2003. Cross became concerned that a confrontation would take place since he had "said the most awful shit about [Stapp] on stage and in print." Cross said that as the taping was preparing to commence, he approached Stapp and extended his hand, introducing himself, and that Stapp shook his hand and sarcastically intoned, "Thanks for the words", to which Cross replied, "Well, you know..."

Personal life
In August 2011, after four years of dating, Cross became engaged to Amber Tamblyn. They married in 2012. On February 21, 2017, Tamblyn announced that she and Cross had recently had a daughter.

Cross, who was raised into Judaism, has described himself as an atheist. He describes his political philosophy as "definitely more socialist Democrat than centrist politician". In an interview in 2016, Cross praised Senator Bernie Sanders and said he admired Sanders "way before he ran for President". In 2021, Cross featured on a video produced by the Gravel Institute, a progressive think tank.

On September 26, 2013, Kickstarter co-founder Yancey Strickler revealed that Cross was the first investor in the crowdfunding platform. Strickler included Cross among the "friends and family" who first financed Kickstarter in 2006.

Cross is a fan of and friends with the musical group Beastie Boys. He is sampled on the beginning of the group's single "Ch-Check It Out" from their album To the 5 Boroughs. One of the group's members, Mike D, did not believe that this was Cross's voice in the sample, and Cross says he had to perform the voice in front of Diamond to prove it was actually him. Cross revealed this while hosting the Beastie Boys SiriusXM channel. Cross also appeared in the group's music video for "Make Some Noise" which was nominated for Video of The Year at the 2011 MTV Video Music Awards. In Spike Jonze documentary Beastie Boys Story, Cross has a post-credit scene in which he interrupts the group's theater performance to poke fun at the commercial failure of their second album, Paul's Boutique''.

Discography

Comedy albums

Videos and films

Compilation appearances

Bibliography

Filmography

Film

Stand-up specials

Television

Video games

Music videos

Podcasts

References

External links

 
 I Drink For A Reason Book website

1964 births
Living people
20th-century American comedians
20th-century American male actors
21st-century American comedians
21st-century American male actors
Jewish American atheists
American male comedians
American male film actors
American male non-fiction writers
American male screenwriters
American male television actors
American male television writers
American male video game actors
American male voice actors
American people of English-Jewish descent
American satirists
American sketch comedians
American social commentators
American stand-up comedians
American television writers
Comedians from Georgia (U.S. state)
Comedians from New York (state)
Emerson College alumni
Jewish American male actors
Jewish American male comedians
Journalists from New York City
Male actors from Atlanta
People from Brooklyn
Primetime Emmy Award winners
Screenwriters from Georgia (U.S. state)
Screenwriters from New York (state)
Stand Up! Records artists
Sub Pop artists